opened in Ikeda, Osaka Prefecture, Japan, in 1957. The new building opened in 1997. The collection, built up by founder Kobayashi Ichizō, whose pseudonym was Itsuō, comprises some 5,500 works, including fifteen Important Cultural Properties and twenty Important Art Objects.

Important Cultural Properties

See also
 Fujita Art Museum
 Kubosō Memorial Museum of Arts, Izumi
 Masaki Art Museum
 Yuki Museum of Art

References

External links

  Itsuo Art Museum
  Collection

Art museums and galleries in Osaka Prefecture
Ikeda, Osaka
Art museums established in 1957
1957 establishments in Japan